This is a list of commercial games for the GP32 handheld game console, which was primarily known for homebrew and emulators.

Most commercial GP32 games could be bought in two ways: boxed or downloaded through the internet through Gamepark's online JoyGP store (typically for a much lower price). Although most games were sold in both formats, there were a few exceptions: for example, Blue Angelo was (and is still being) only sold as a boxed copy made in France, and Gloop Deluxe was only sold online, but not through JoyGP.

Only  games were released.

This list does not include those commercial games which can be played on the console with the use of interpreters. All such interpreters may be found at the OpenHandhelds Archive.

References

References/external links
Roundup and reviews of most commercial GP32 games on Insert Credit
More complete roundup at GP32newbie

Game Park
GP32